The Heckler & Koch SL6 is a roller-delayed blowback operated sporting carbine made by Heckler & Koch. It was chambered in 5.56×45mm NATO. The design was originally based on the Heckler & Koch 630 hunting rifle and is essentially a shorter-barreled version of that rifle. It was marketed throughout the world as a hunting/utility rifle.

Unlike the roller-delayed blowback military Heckler & Koch rifles the cocking handle is situated far more rearward and on the right side and features a camming system to help overcome the initial friction exerted by the "bolt head locking lever" anti-bounce mechanism that prevents the bolt from bouncing off the barrel's breech surface.

Replacement
The Heckler & Koch SL6 is no longer manufactured, having been replaced by the Heckler & Koch SLB 2000.

Variants
The Heckler & Koch SL6A2 variant is essentially the same rifle; however, the SL6A2 includes a flash hider and offers a two-round burst selector.
The HK 630, a 5.56×45mm NATO/.223 Remington hunting rifle variant of the Heckler & Koch SL6, lacked the wooden handguard of the SL6 and was equipped with a longer barrel with integral flash hider/compensator slots at the end of the barrel, open rear leaf sights, and sporting-style buttstock.
The Heckler & Koch SL7 is variant chambered in 7.62×51mm NATO.

References

External links

 HK SL6 at HKPro.com
 HK SL6
 HK SL7
 HK SL6 at Modern Firearms & Ammunition
 HK SL6, HK SL7 manual (German)
 HK 630, HK 770, HK 940 Instructions for use
 H&K SL-6 and SL-7 Rifles

5.56×45mm NATO semi-automatic rifles
Heckler & Koch rifles
Roller-delayed blowback firearms